Lamia (Lamía) is a city in central Greece. The city dates back to antiquity, and is today the capital of the regional unit of Phthiotis and of the Central Greece region (comprising five regional units). According to the 2011 census, the Municipality of Lamia has a population of 75.315 while Lamia itself a population of 52,006 inhabitants. The city is located on the slopes of Mount Othrys, near the river Spercheios. It serves as the agricultural center of a fertile rural and livestock area.

Name
One account says that the city was named after the mythological figure of Lamia, the daughter of Poseidon and queen of the Trachineans. Another holds that it is named after the Malians, the inhabitants of the surrounding area. In the Middle Ages, Lamia was called Zetounion (Ζητούνιον), a name first encountered in the 8th Ecumenical Council in 869. It was known as Girton under Frankish rule following the Fourth Crusade and later El Citó when it was controlled by the Catalan Company of mercenaries. In Turkish, it was sometimes called İzdin or İzzeddin. The city was also known as Zeitoun.

History

Archaeological excavations have shown the site of Lamia to have been inhabited since at least the Bronze Age (3rd millennium BC).

In antiquity, the city played an important role due to its strategic location, controlling the narrow coastal plain above Thermopylae that connected southern Greece with Thessaly and the rest of the Balkans. The city formed a polis (city-state). The city was therefore fortified in the 5th century BC, and was contested by the Macedonians, Thessalians and Aetolians until the Roman conquest in the early 2nd century BC. After Alexander the Great's death in 323 BC, the Athenians and other Greeks rebelled against Macedonian overlordship. Antipatros, the regent of Macedon, took refuge behind the substantial walls of the city (Lamian War, 323–322 BC). The war ended with the death of the Athenian general Leosthenes, and the arrival of a 20,000-strong Macedonian army. Lamia prospered afterwards, especially in the 3rd century BC under Aetolian hegemony, which came to an end when Manius Acilius Glabrio sacked the city in 190 BC.

Little is known of the city's history after. In Late Antiquity, the city was the seat of a bishop (attested since 431), suffragan of Larissa, but had declined to obscurity: for instance, it is not shown on the 5th-century Tabula Peutingeriana. Some archaeological remains from the period have been found in the Castle (the city's ancient acropolis), including a basilica, coins and marble inscriptions, while the walls of the Castle are thought to have been rebuilt under Justinian I in the 6th century. The Synecdemus of Hierocles includes Lamia among the 16 cities of the province of Thessaly.

The city was occupied by Slavs in the 7th century, and re-appears only in 869/70 under the name of Zetounion (Ζητοῦνιον), probably deriving from a Slavic word for "grain". The city played once more a role in the Byzantine–Bulgarian wars of the late 10th century due to its vicinity to Thermopylae: it was near the town that the Byzantine general Nikephoros Ouranos scored a crushing victory over Tsar Samuel of Bulgaria in the Battle of Spercheios in 997. The city was visited by Emperor Basil II in his triumphal journey to Greece in 1018, and in 1165, the Jewish traveller Benjamin of Tudela recorded 50 Jewish families in the city and of raids by the neighbouring Vlachs.

Following the Fourth Crusade (1204), the city was captured by the Frankish crusaders. Initially, it was given as a fief to the Knights Templar, who rebuilt its fortress. In 1209–10 the Templars were evicted due to their support to the rebellion of the Lombard barons of the Kingdom of Thessalonica. The Latin Emperor Henry of Flanders confiscated the city (and neighbouring Ravennika) and made it an imperial domain under a bailli, possibly Rainerio of Travale. Under Frankish rule, it was the seat of a Roman Catholic bishop (Dioecesis Sidoniensis or Cythoniensis), probably a suffragan of the Latin Archbishop of Neopatras. In , or shortly after 1223, the two towns were captured by the Epirote Greeks. Lamia remained in Greek hands until it was surrendered again to the Franks of the Duchy of Athens in 1275 as part of the dowry of Helena Angelina Komnene, daughter of John I Doukas, ruler of Thessaly. It thereby again became a Catholic see.

The Catalans held the city from 1318 until 1391, when it passed to the Acciaioli Dukes of Athens. The fortress was razed by the Ottoman Sultan Bayezid I in 1394. After the disastrous Battle of Ankara in 1402, the weakened Ottomans were forced to return some territories, including the region of Zetounion, to Byzantine rule. The Turks besieged the city for two years sometime before 1415, but the Byzantines resisted successfully. Sometime between 1424 and July 1426, however, the city had been once more conquered by the Turks. Apart from an attack by the troops of the Despotate of the Morea in 1444, which plundered the city, from then on the town remained under firm Ottoman control until it became part of the newly independent Kingdom of Greece in 1832. Until the annexation of Thessaly in 1881, it was a border city (the borders were drawn at a site known as "Taratsa" just north of Lamia).

Climate
Lamia has a hot-summer Mediterranean climate. It has 4 seasons; winter, spring, summer and autumn. Cold period lasts from late November to mid March and warm from mid April to late October. The record lowest temperature ever in Lamia is -13 °C (2001) and the record highest is 46.5 °C (1973). These are the following record highs yearly in °C: 24 (Jan), 25 (Feb), 33 (Mar), 33 (Apr), 40 (May), 45 (Jun), 47 (Jul), 46 (Aug), 41 (Sep), 38 (Oct), 30 (Nov), 26 (Dec).

The most pleasant period is from April to end June and also on September to late October.

Landmarks

Lamia Castle, the city's fortified Acropolis
Platia Eleftherias (Freedom Square) - site of the towns independence day parade, and main cathedral. Also has many cafes with outdoor seating.
Platia Diakou (Diakos Square) - square containing the statue of Athanasios Diakos
Platia Parkou (Park Square)
Platia Laou (People's Square) - square featuring the statue of Aris Velouchiotis

Transport

Road
Highway 1 passes close to the city , while Central Greece Highway (Highway 3) is under construction , which will start south of Lamia. Interurban KTEL station serves transfers to and from Lamia.

Bus
The urban KTEL of the city serves the transport of the apartments and settlements of the Municipality of Lamia. Also, in Lamia there are several taxi "piazzas". City taxis are red. In addition, cycle paths operate within Lamia.

Rail
The city is served by Lamta railway station, with Regional services to Leianokladi and Stylida.

Air transport 
Lamia Airport is located 2 kilometres from the Old Lamia-Athens National Road. The airport belongs to the Air Force and has no commercial or passenger traffic. It is used in emergency situations. The Aeroclub of Fthiotida also uses it for its activities.

Municipality
The municipality Lamia was formed at the 2011 local government reform by the merger of the following 5 former municipalities, that became municipal units:
Gorgopotamos
Lamia
Leianokladi (Lianokladi)
Pavliani
Ypati

The municipality has an area of 947.006 km2, the municipal unit 413.482 km2.

Education
Six departments of the University of Thessaly based in the city.

Historical population

Notable people

Athanasios Diakos (1788–1821) Greek military commander during the Greek War of Independence, died in Lamia
Dimitrios Giatzis (1891–1964) Army officer
Ioannis Paparrodou (1904–1941) Army Officer
Aris Velouchiotis (nom de guerre of Athanasios Klaras) (1905–1945), leader of the World War II guerrilla resistance (Greek People's Liberation Army)
Ilias Tsirimokos (1907–1968) politician, former Prime Minister of Greece
Thanos Leivaditis (1934–2005) actor and screenwriter
Dimitris Koutsoumpas (1955) General Secretary of the Communist Party of Greece
Niki Bakoyianni (1968) high jumper (Olympic silver medalist)
Christos Staikouras (1973) economist, politician, New Democracy's Coordinator of Economic Affairs, Minister of Finance
 (1984) actress

International relations

Lamia is twinned with:
 Rzeszów, Poland
 Chioggia, Italy
 Mytilene, Greece
 Paphos, Cyprus

Sporting teams

Lamia has some sport clubs that play in the higher national divisions. For a period of one season, Lamia hosted the Athenian basketball club Panellinios B.C. The main clubs of Lamia are shown below.

Gallery

See also
University of Central Greece
List of settlements in Phthiotis
List of traditional Greek place names

References

Sources
 
 
 
Πάλλης, Γιώργος (2020). Από τη Λαμία στο Ζητούνι: Ανασυνθέτοντας μια μικρή βυζαντινή πόλη. Αθήνα: Gutenberg. .

External links
 Municipality of Lamia 

 
Greek prefectural capitals
Greek regional capitals
Municipalities of Central Greece
Cities in ancient Greece
Catholic titular sees in Europe
Medieval sites in Central Greece
Achaea Phthiotis
Populated places in ancient Thessaly
Thessalian city-states
Populated places in Phthiotis